Suillus americanus is a species of fungus in the mushroom family Suillaceae. Commonly known as the chicken fat mushroom, American suillus, it grows in a mycorrhizal association with eastern white pine and is found where this tree occurs in eastern North America and China. The mushroom can be recognized by the bright yellow cap with red to reddish-brown scales embedded in slime, the large yellow angular pores on the underside of the cap, and the narrow yellow stem marked with dark reddish dots. Molecular phylogenetics analysis suggests that S. americanus may be the same species as S. sibiricus, found in western North America and western and central Asia. Suillus americanus is edible, although opinions vary as to its palatability; some susceptible individuals may suffer a contact dermatitis after touching the fruit bodies. The fruit bodies contain a beta glucan carbohydrate shown in laboratory tests to have anti-inflammatory properties.

Taxonomy and classification

Suillus americanus was first described scientifically by American mycologist Charles Horton Peck in 1888, based on specimens he had originally collected as far back as 1869, in New York state, near Sand Lake, Albany, and Port Jefferson. In his 1888 publication he indicated that he had originally listed these collections as Boletus flavidus (now known as Suillus flavidus) in his 1869 Report of the State Botanist (published in 1872). However, as was pointed out nearly a century later in 1986, the 1869 report does not actually mention the species; rather, Peck's field notes that year (which served as the basis for the report) reference a collection at Sand Lake upon which the original (1888) description was most likely based. Because Peck failed to designate a type specimen, one of the Sand Lake specimens was lectotypified in 1986.

In 1931, French mycologist Édouard-Jean Gilbert transferred the species to the genus Ixocomus, a now-defunct taxon that has since been subsumed into Suillus. In 1959, Walter H. Snell, collaborating with Rolf Singer and Esther A. Dick, transferred the species to Suillus. In his 1986 version of the authoritative monograph The Agaricales in Modern Taxonomy, Singer included the species in the subsection Latiporini of genus Suillus, an infrageneric grouping (below the taxonomic level of genus) characterized by a cinnamon-colored spore print without an olive tinge, and wide pores, typically greater than 1 mm when mature.

Common names for the species include the American slipperycap, the American suillus, or the chicken-fat mushroom. The latter name is a reference to its yellow color. The specific epithet americanus means "of America".

Description

The cap margin is curved inwards in young specimens, and may have remnants of a yellowish, cottony veil hanging from it. The cap surface is colored bright yellow with red or brownish streaks and hairy patches. When the fruit body is young and moist, the surface is slimy; as the cap matures and dries out, it becomes sticky or tacky.

They are yellow, and stain reddish-brown when bruised. The yellow pores are large (1–2 mm diameter) and angular, and tend to become darker as they age. The pores are slightly wider than long, so that there are about 9–10 pores per centimeter measured radially, but 12 to 13 per centimeter when measured tangentially, about halfway to the edge. As is the case with all boletes, spores form on the inner surfaces of the tubes and sift through their openings to be borne away on the air currents outside.

The color of the stem surface is lemon yellow, and it is covered with glandular dots that bruise if handled. The partial veil is not attached to the stem, and usually does not leave a ring on the stem. A whitish mycelium present at the base of the stem helps anchor the fruit body in the substrate. The flesh is mustard yellow, and stains pinkish-brown when cut or bruised.

Microscopic characteristics

In deposit, the spores are cinnamon-colored. Viewed with a microscope, they are pale yellow, smooth, and roughly elliptical in shape, and measure 8–9.5 by 3.5–5 µm. The basidia, the spore-bearing cells, are club-shaped and 4-spored, with dimensions of 21–25 by 5.5 to 6 µm. The pleurocystidia (cystidia found on the sides of a gill) range in shape from cylindrical to club-shaped and are arranged in bundles. Both the bases of the bundles and the surface of the cystidia may be covered with brown pigment particles. Cheilocystidia are cystidia located in the gill faces. In S. americanus, they are mostly club-shaped, often with an expanded apex, and like the pleurocystidia, are arranged in bundles, with brown pigment particles at the base of the bundles. Bundles of cystidia near the tube openings may sometimes be visible with a hand lens. Like all Suillus species, the cystidia of S. americanus will turn orange-brown in the presence of a solution of 3% potassium hydroxide.  The slimy layer on the cap surface results from an interwoven layer of gelatinous hyphae that are typically 3–5 µm thick.

Edibility

This species is nonpoisonous and sometimes regarded as edible, but opinions about its palatibility are mixed. It has no odor and its taste has been reported as mild. One field guide suggests it has a "distinctive lemony tang", and another says, "The yellow cap may remind you of chicken fat; it has a wonderfully savory mushroom flavor." The slimy texture of the mushroom has been compared to okra. One cookbook author suggests that the mushroom is ideal for spreads, for use on bread or as a dip; baking the fruit bodies in an oven will dry them for future use, and concentrate the flavor.  The slimy caps and the pore layer are typically removed before consumption. Another field guide mentions that the "thin flesh hardly make this species worthwhile."

Similar species
Suillus americanus is very similar in appearance to Suillus sibiricus (distributed in  western North America and western and central Asia) but the latter species associates with Pinus monticola and Pinus flexilis rather than Pinus strobus. One field guide suggests that Suillus sibiricus has a thicker stem than S. americanus, brown spots on the cap, and is a darker, more dingy yellow. Molecular phylogenetics analysis has shown, however, that specimens of S. sibricus collected from China and western North America, as well as S. americanus from eastern North America, are most likely "a single circumboreal taxon".

Another lookalike species is Suillus subaureus, which can be distinguished microscopically by slightly smaller, hyaline (translucent) spores (typically 7.5–8.5 by 3 µm), and an association with Quaking Aspen (Populus tremuloides).

Habitat and distribution

Suillus americanus is a common species, and is found growing solitarily or in clusters on the ground throughout northeastern North America, north to Canada, where it typically fruits in the late summer and autumn. It is also found in Guangdong, China, an example of a disjunct distribution. Fruit bodies can often be found in drier weather when other species are not abundant.

Suillus americanus is a mycorrhizal species, a mutualistic relationship where the fungus forms a sheath on the surface of the root from which hyphae extend outward into the soil, and inwards between the cortical cells with which they interface to form a Hartig net. The main benefit for the fungus is constant access to a supply of carbohydrates produced by the plant's photosynthesis, while the plant benefits from an enhanced supply of mineral nutrients from the soil, taken up by the hyphae of the fungus. It grows in association with pines, particularly eastern white pine (Pinus strobus).

Allergenicity

Some susceptible individuals have experienced an allergic reaction after touching Suillus americanus. The symptoms of allergic contact dermatitis generally develop one to two days after initial contact, persist for roughly a week, then disappear without treatment. Cooking the fruit bodies inactivates the responsible allergens.

Bioactive compounds
Suillus americanus contains a polysaccharide known as a beta glucan that laboratory tests suggest may have anti-inflammatory activity. Known specifically as a (1→3)-, (1→4)-β-D-glucan, its natural function is as a component of the fungal cell wall, where it forms microcrystalline fibrils in the wall that give it rigidity and strength. The anti-inflammatory activity results from the polysaccharide's ability to inhibit the production of nitric oxide in activated macrophages, a cell of the immune system.

See also
List of North American boletes

References

Cited text

Edible fungi
Fungi described in 1887
Fungi of China
Fungi of North America
americanus